Holguín is a municipality and city in Cuba, and the capital of Province of Holguín. After Havana, Santiago de Cuba, and Camagüey, it is the fourth largest city in Cuba.

History

Before Columbus, the Taino people settled in huts made from royal palm in the Holguin area later urbanized by the Spanish; their artifacts are shown at the local Holguin La Periquera museum. The settlement was founded in 1523 on land donated by Diego Velázquez de Cuéllar to Captain Francisco García Holguín, a Spanish military officer. Holguin added his maternal surname to the name of the town, giving it the name San Isidoro de Holguín.  Prior to 1976, Holguín was located in the province of Oriente. Before Pope Francis's visit to the United States, in September 2015, he visited Cuba, and one of his stops was at the Diocese of Holguín to, among other things, commemorate the location where Christopher Columbus landed.

Geography
The municipality is divided into repartos or barrios. The old municipality was more extense, and in 1940 included: Aguarás, Aguas Claras, Alcalá, Arroyo Blanco del Sur, Báguanos, Cabezuelas, Cacocum, Calderón, Camazán, Cauto del Cristo, Corralillo, Cruces de Purnio, Damián, Floro Pérez, Gibara, Guabasiabo, Guayabal, Guirabo, Haticos del Purial, La Aguada, La Cuaba, La Palma, La Rioja, Las Calabazas, Managuaco, Melones, Norte, Omaja, Purnio, San Agustín, San Andrés, San Francisco, San Juan, San Lorenzo, Santa Rita, Sur, Tacámara, Tasajeras, Uñas, Uñitas, Velasco, Yareyal and Yayal.

At present time, some of the above are part of other municipalities, but the following still belong to Holguín: Aguas Claras, Guirabo, La Cuaba, Las Calabazas, Purnio, San Andrés, Yareyal.

Economy

The brewery Cervecería Bucanero is based in the city.  It makes three brands of beer: Bucanero, Cristal and Mayabe.

There are two small hotels (or villas) focusing on health tourism in the outskirts of the city, very close to the airport: Villa El Quinque and Villa El Cocal. Patients like Argentine football (soccer) star Diego Maradona have been treated there for substance addiction.

There are also two established city hotels (Pernik and El Bosque). More recently, a few small (boutique) hotels, managed by Hoteles E, have opened (Caballeriza, one block away from Parque San Isidoro (Las Flores), and Esmeralda, right across from Parque San José). As of May, 2020, and after a major restoration, there's a third boutique hotel about to be inaugurated (Saratoga, right across one of the corners of the main plaza and heart of the city (Parque Calixto Garcia).

Demographics
In 2004, the municipality of Holguín had a population of 326,740.

Infrastructure

There are several small city parks such as Parque Infantil, Parque San José, Parque San Isidoro (Las Flores), Parque Martí, among others, most central the Calixto García in the downtown area. Close by one finds the galleries Centro Provincial de Arte and Bayado, a library, the club Casa de la Trova, the Martí cinema, the Theatre Eddy Suñol, the Province Museum La Periquera, a science museum, and a history museum.

One of the most famous landmarks of the city is the hill Loma de la Cruz (English: Hill of the Cross), which can be ascended by climbing its +450 stairs, and from where the whole city can be admired. There, in the early years of the city, a large cross was erected with the belief that it would protect it from evil coming down from the North.

Holguín has a baseball stadium, named after Calixto García.

Transportation
Holguín is served by Frank País Airport (HOG/MUHG), located at 20°47´08"N, 076°18´54"W, with flights to Havana and several other world destinations, mostly in Canada and Europe.

Education
The main post-secondary education institution is the University of Holguín "Oscar Lucero Moya" (Spanish: Universidad de Holguín "Oscar Lucero Moya", UHO).

Other post-secondary educational centers are: Universidad de Ciencias Médicas (University of Medical Sciences) "Mariana Grajales", Universidad Pedagógica (Pedagogical University of Holguin, formerly Instituto Superior Pedagógico, ISPH) "José de la Luz y Caballero", and Universidad Deportiva (formerly Facultad de Cultura Física) "Manuel Piti Fajardo".

Notable residents
Faustino Oramas, Cuban composer and musician
Mario Kindelán, Olympic Gold Medalist amateur boxer
Eglise Gutiérrez, opera singer
Reinaldo Arenas, poet and novelist
Oscar Hijuelos, Cuban-American Pulitzer Prize-winning author, whose parents were born and raised in Holguín before immigrating to the USA.
Puntillita (Manuel Licea), Cuban popular singer
Aroldis Chapman, Major League Baseball player
Odalis Revé, Olympic Gold Medallist judoka

Sister cities

 Santa Fe, New Mexico, United States 
 Saltillo, Coahuila, Mexico
 Yazd, Yazd Province, Iran

References

Bibliography

External links

 Holguín Web portal
English-language city guide
Holguin beaches guide
Holguin Cuba 
Cuba Holguin
Holguin 
Casa particular website - English city guide and photos

 
Cities in Cuba
Populated places in Holguín Province
Populated places established in 1523
1520s establishments in Cuba
1523 establishments in the Spanish West Indies